1780 in sports describes the year's events in world sport.

Boxing
Events
 It was probably during this year that Harry Sellers reclaimed the vacant English Championship but he is not known to have defended it before 1785.

Cricket
Events
 Duke & Son of Penshurst made the first-ever six-seam cricket ball.
England
 Most runs – Joseph Miller and James Aylward 142
 Most wickets – Lumpy Stevens 18

Horse racing
Events
 Inaugural running of The Derby, sometimes called the Epsom Derby for differentiation purposes, on Epsom Downs. The third-oldest of the five British Classic Races, the race is named after its founder, the 12th Earl of Derby.
England
 The Derby – Diomed
 The Oaks – Tetotum
 St Leger Stakes – Ruler

References

 
1780